Bluewater Park is a suburb of Bluewater in the City of Townsville, Queensland, Australia.

Geography 
The suburb is to the immediate south-west of the Bluewater township, approximately 33 kilometres WNW of Townsville.  

The Bluewater Park district is made up of the residential housing area on the southern end of Forestry Road, beginning approximately halfway down the road at the turnoff to Bluemountain Drive.  However, the community recreational area that also goes by the name of "Bluewater Park" is situated in the actual township of Bluewater.

History 

References

External links 

 

Suburbs of Townsville